The 2006–07 Austrian First League (known as the Erste Liga due to sponsorship) was the 33rd Second division season. In this season, the league was expanded to 12 teams from the previous season's number of 10 teams. This meant that the previous Promotion/relegation play-off system no longer existed and all three Regionalliga Champions would now be automatically promoted while the bottom three finishers in the First League would now be relegated directly as well. Games for this season began on the 1 August 2006 and concluded on the 25 May 2007 with the Champions LASK Linz winning the League by a comfortable 13 points over second placed, SC Schwanenstadt.

Team movements

Promoted to Bundesliga
 SC Rheindorf Altach

Relegated from Bundesliga
 VfB Admira Wacker Mödling

Promoted from Regionalliga
 FC Lustenau
 SC-ESV Parndorf 1919
 TSV Hartberg1

Relegated to Regionalliga
 FC Kufstein

Teams

Table

External links
 RSSSF Link
 Weltfussball.de
 Kicker.de

2. Liga (Austria) seasons
Austria
2006–07 in Austrian football